Nehalennia or Nehellenia may refer to: 

 Nehalennia, the ancient European goddess
 Nehalennia, a genus of insect, of the family Coenagrionidae
Queen Nehellenia, an antagonist from the Sailor Moon series.
 A song on the album Uit oude grond by Dutch band Heidevolk.